Drums Along the Hudson is the debut album by American power pop band The Bongos, released in 1982 by record label PVC.

Reception 

Time Out called the album "one of the best albums to come out of the NYC area during the fertile, shadowy period between punk and new wave". AllMusic called it "a minor masterpiece".

Re-issues
The album has been reissued numerous times on several labels including Line Records (Germany), Razor & Tie, and Jem Records. The 2007 Special Edition re-issue on Cooking Vinyl Records contains 12 bonus tracks, including a remake of "The Bulrushes" produced by and featuring Moby.

Track listing
"In the Congo"
"The Bulrushes"
"Clay Midgets"
"Video Eyes"
"Glow in the Dark"
"Telephoto Lens"
"Certain Harbours"
"Speaking Sands"
"Burning Bush"
"Automatic Doors"
"Hunting"
"Zebra Club"
"Three Wise Men"
"Mambo Sun" (Marc Bolan)
"Question Ball"

References

External links 

 

1982 debut albums
The Bongos albums
Albums produced by Ken Thomas (record producer)